Doddachellur is a village in the Challakere taluk of Karnataka state, India. The population is around 1500 according to the 2011 Census of India.

References 

Villages in Chitradurga district